Emiliano Franco Pola (born 21 October 1994) he is a Spanish soccer player with Argentine nationality; professional footballer who plays as an attacking midfielder for Tepatitlán F.C. of the Liga de Expansión MX of México.

Career
Franco started his career with Newell's Old Boys. He made his professional debut with the club during the 2016 Argentine Primera División season, playing the final thirty-two minutes of a 2–0 defeat to Temperley on 15 May 2016. He made one further appearance a week later against Atlético Tucumán. On 27 August 2017, Franco joined Torneo Federal A side Douglas Haig. His first appearance arrived on 4 October versus Gimnasia y Esgrima. Ahead of the 2018–19 Torneo Federal A, Franco was signed by Defensores de Belgrano. After eighteen appearances, Franco then spent 2019–20 with Huracán Las Heras.

In 2020, Franco switched Argentina for Portugal after agreeing terms with AD Oliveirense. He made his debut in a Campeonato de Portugal defeat to Marítimo B on 9 February, which preceded three further appearances before the season's curtailment due to the COVID-19 pandemic. The succeeding September saw Franco move to Spain with Tercera División team Ibiza. He scored his first senior goal on debut against Manacor on 10 January. His next goal arrived on 21 March versus Felanitx.

Personal life
He is the son of former Argentina international footballer Darío Franco. Franco became stranded in Portugal during the COVID-19 pandemic, having also not been paid since his arrival. He managed to return to his homeland in May after the Associação de Emergência Humanitária intervened.

Career statistics
.

References

External links

1994 births
Living people
Sportspeople from Córdoba Province, Argentina
Argentine footballers
Association football midfielders
Argentine expatriate footballers
Expatriate footballers in Portugal
Expatriate footballers in Spain
Argentine expatriate sportspeople in Portugal
Argentine expatriate sportspeople in Spain
Argentine Primera División players
Torneo Federal A players
Campeonato de Portugal (league) players
Tercera División players
Newell's Old Boys footballers
Club Atlético Douglas Haig players
Defensores de Belgrano de Villa Ramallo players
AD Oliveirense players
CD Ibiza Islas Pitiusas players